The Globe Hotel, also known as The Janet Block, is a historic three-story building in Spokane, Washington. It was designed by architect Albert Held, and built in 1908 at a cost of $80,000 for the Inland Investment Company. When it opened, the hotel had 32 en-suite rooms out of 72. It has been listed on the National Register of Historic Places since December 17, 1998.

References

Hotel buildings on the National Register of Historic Places in Washington (state)
National Register of Historic Places in Spokane County, Washington
Early Commercial architecture in the United States
Hotel buildings completed in 1908